Lewis "Lew" Moxon is a fictional character appearing in American comic books published by DC Comics. He is most famous for hiring Joe Chill to murder young Bruce Wayne's parents in early versions of Batman's origin story, thus making him indirectly responsible for Batman's existence.

Publication history
Lew Moxon first appeared in Detective Comics #235 and was created by Bill Finger and Sheldon Moldoff.

Fictional character biography

Golden / Silver Age version
Sometime prior to their murder, Dr. Thomas Wayne and his wife Martha attend a costume party to which Dr. Wayne wears a bat-like costume. Thomas is subsequently taken from the party at gunpoint to meet notorious racketeer and bank robber Lew Moxon, who forces the doctor to remove a bullet from his shoulder. After completing the operation, he overpowers Moxon and his men and escapes. Lew Moxon is then arrested and sentenced to ten years in prison for armed robbery. As he is taken away, he swears revenge on Thomas Wayne convinced that he is to blame for his downfall. Ten years later, Moxon's first order of business after getting released is to inform Thomas that he will get someone else to exact that revenge. It is suggested that Moxon specifically ordered Joe Chill to kill the Waynes but keep young Bruce alive, thus providing a convincing alibi for the criminal and allowing him to make the hit look like a failed robbery. Years later, Batman learns of Lew Moxon's involvement in the murder of his parents, by which time the aging gangster is operating a blimp business. Batman's first attempt to convict Moxon for the murder of his parents fails as he is now suffering from amnesia and is able to pass a lie detector test since he remembers nothing of that night. He is then released on bail with his only official crime being a minor charge for assault. Batman determines that Moxon's blimp business must be a cover for illegal activities and continues to trail the gangster. Eventually, after uncovering that Moxon is indeed using his blimps for criminal purposes, Batman confronts him while wearing his father's costume (his own had been damaged during an earlier fight). On seeing Dr. Wayne's costume, Moxon suddenly remembers what he had done. Thinking Batman was actually Thomas Wayne's ghost seeking revenge, Moxon panics and runs out into the street where he is run over and killed by a truck.

Post Zero Hour version
Lew Moxon was reintroduced into the Post-Zero Hour Batman continuity as an aging mob boss with failed political aspirations, who returned to Gotham City after several years in self-imposed exile. Years earlier, Lew Moxon traveled in the same circle of wealthy socialites as Bruce's parents, and considered the Waynes to be friendly associates despite their disdain towards his criminal activities. Bruce is invited to a party celebrating Moxon's return, at which he is reintroduced to the old man's daughter, Mallory, who turns out to be Bruce's childhood sweetheart. At the party, Wayne discovers that Moxon is the target of professional assassin Deadshot. For protection, Moxon has employed the ruthless Philo Zeiss as his bodyguard.

During an earlier story, Zeiss killed Bruce's friend, Jeremy Samuels. When Bruce confronts Zeiss as Batman, Zeiss reveals that the murder of Samuels was carried out under the order of Moxon himself, as retaliation for something that Thomas Wayne had done to him years ago.

Lew Moxon survives Deadshot's assassination attempts (though now uses a wheelchair), but fires Zeiss for his failure. Batman discovers Mallory is an active member of her family's criminal empire.

Ultimately, Batman discovers that Thomas, Martha, and (a very young) Bruce Wayne had attended a costume party (to which Dr. Wayne wore a Zorro costume) which was also attended by Moxon. At the party, Angelo Berretti, an "employee" of Moxon's business, told Dr. Wayne that a man's life was in danger. Dr. Wayne made Berretti promise his safe return before departing. He was then informed that the man in question was Moxon's nephew, who needed a bullet removed from his shoulder following a failed armed robbery. Dr. Wayne performed the operation, but refused to take any money for his services, and attacked Moxon. Following this, a furious Moxon had ordered a hit on Wayne, only to be thwarted by Berretti as he wanted to honor his word. Years later, Batman questions Berretti as to whether his former boss had been involved in the murder of the Waynes (which occurred a few months after the costume party). Berretti tells him Moxon was not involved. After Batman accepts Berretti's version of events and departs, Berretti holds his hand to his face and utters an ambiguous "Oh, thank God". Lew Moxon's involvement in the killing of the Wayne is, therefore, left to the reader's imagination.

At the time when Bruce Wayne was accused of murder, Nightwing goes to stakeout Lew Moxon's house where he overhears him and Mallory arguing about the news revolving around Bruce Wayne.

Lew Moxon (alongside his current bodyguard Hellhound) is later killed by his former protector Zeiss at a meeting of Gotham's crime bosses (arranged by Spoiler). This event occurs at the commencement of the Batman: War Games story line.

DC Universe
In the pages of Batman: Three Jokers, Lew Moxon was mentioned to have owned a restaurant called Lew's Restaurant. It was mentioned in the news that the last members of the dwindling Moxon Crime Family were killed at their restaurant where an eyewitness states that Joker was responsible. It was also mentioned that the Moxon Crime Family were accused of orchestrating the deaths of Thomas Wayne and Martha Wayne only to be exonerated when Joe Chill confessed that he worked alone.

Place in continuity
During the Golden Age of Comic Books, Lew Moxon was established as the man who hired Joe Chill to kill Bruce Wayne's parents.

During the Silver and Bronze Age of Comic Books, the Lew Moxon story remained canonical for tales set on Earth-Two. For several years no mention is made of Moxon's role regarding the origin of Batman on Earth One - that is until the Len Wein's mini-series, The Untold Legend of the Batman (published in 1980) re-introduced the Lew Moxon story, exactly as it was told in 1956. The canonical presence of the character is reinforced in the feature story in Detective Comics #500, "To Kill a Legend" when Batman and Robin are sent to a parallel Earth to avert the murder of that version of the Waynes. To accomplish that goal, the superheroes find and question that world's version of Moxon about the whereabouts of Chill. Moxon had not yet hired Chill to perform the murder and with the attention of this bizarre figure, accelerated his plan with a different killer to first murder Chill and then the Waynes. Batman discovered the dying Chill and deduced that the Waynes were in danger that very night; thus, Batman managed to arrive in Crime Alley in time and stop the murder.

During the post-Crisis era, no mention is made of Lew Moxon, making his canonical status during this time uncertain. In Batman: Year Two, Batman confronts Joe Chill, much as he did in the Golden and Silver Age continuities. However, just as in previous continuities, Chill makes no reference to Lew Moxon before his demise.

During the post-Zero Hour era, while Lew Moxon does appear in several issues, Joe Chill does not.

After the events of Infinite Crisis, Joe Chill is again known to be responsible for the murder of the Waynes, and he was arrested for the crime on that same night. In Grant Morrison's Batman #673, Batman learns Chill acted on his own and that his parents' deaths were not ordered by someone else.

Other versions
In the prequel comic to Justice League: Gods and Monsters, Batman tracks down Lew Moxon during a meeting with the other crime lords, along with his right-hand man, Joe Chill. When Batman corners them, Moxon offers him money to come work for him, but Batman refuses and then kills Moxon by sucking his blood. Kirk later attends Moxon's funeral where he meets Moxon's wife Angela and his son Jeremy. Kirk later becomes friends with Jeremy and reveals his secret to him. Jeremy then agrees to help Kirk find a cure for his condition. When Angela is murdered, Jeremy reveals that the other crime lords believe that Moxon had evidence against them and they also believe that he knows where they are. Batman later tracks down Angela's murderer, who turns out to be Joe Chill, who is now a vampire after Batman killed him. Batman though later on kills Chill with an axe. When he returns, Batman reveals to Jeremy that he found out that the other crime boss Chill was trying to defeat was Jeremy, who was groomed by Moxon to be a mobster like him and that his innocent, charming image was just an illusion. He then tells Jeremy that he doesn't want to be cured anymore. Jeremy then reveals that he knew that he killed his father and then offers that they work together. Before he leaves, Batman kills Jeremy by sucking his blood, leaving his body to sit in front of the fireplace.

In other media
Lew Moxon appeared in the Batman: The Brave and the Bold episode "Chill of the Night!", voiced by Richard Moll. This version only wanted to kill Thomas Wayne, but retains guilt for leaving Bruce Wayne an orphan as the hit also killed Martha Wayne. Batman (disguised as a priest) learns of the killer's identity from Moxon as he gives a deathbed confession. When Phantom Stranger brings Batman to the past to encounter his parents at a masquerade ball, Batman and Thomas fend off Moxon's thugs who crashed the masquerade ball to rob it. Moxon was in prison while he hired Chill to dispose of Thomas, thus Batman has a lead on his parents' killer.
 Lew Moxon is mentioned in Batman: Arkham Origins.
 A Moxon Cleaning company appears in Gotham Knights.

See also
 List of Batman family enemies

References

Batman characters
Fictional business executives
DC Comics supervillains
Fictional murderers
Fictional gangsters
Comics characters introduced in 1956
Characters created by Bill Finger
Characters created by Sheldon Moldoff
Fictional crime bosses